Louis Nelson (born May 28, 1951) is an American former National Basketball Association (NBA) player. Nelson was drafted with the first pick in the second round of the 1973 NBA draft by the Baltimore Bullets. Before the 1974–75 NBA season, Nelson was taken by the New Orleans Jazz in the NBA Expansion Draft. After playing two seasons with the Jazz, the Jazz waived him. Nelson was signed by the San Antonio Spurs before the 1976–77 NBA season, but was waived after four games. In the 1977–78 NBA season, Nelson's final NBA season, he played for the Kansas City Kings and New Jersey Nets. In his NBA career, Nelson averaged 9.4 points, 2.4 rebounds and 1.9 assists per game.
Louie is now a math teacher in LA Jordan High School. He coaches the girls basketball team.

References

1951 births
Living people
African-American basketball players
American men's basketball players
Basketball players from Los Angeles
Capital Bullets draft picks
Capital Bullets players
Compton High School alumni
Kansas City Kings players
New Jersey Nets players
New Orleans Jazz players
Point guards
San Antonio Spurs players
Shooting guards
Basketball players from Compton, California
Washington Huskies men's basketball players
21st-century African-American people
20th-century African-American sportspeople